Nicolás Ignacio Millán Carrasco (born 17 November 1991) is a Chilean footballer, who currently plays for Segunda División Profesional de Chile side Deportes Iberia.

He is best known for being the youngest player to represent a Chilean team in professional football. His substitute appearance for Chilean club Colo Colo against Santiago Wanderers at the age of fourteen years, nine months and three days smashed the previous record of Frank Lobos considerably.

Career

Colo-Colo
Millán, a precociously gifted attacking player, joined Colo Colo's youth set-up in 2003, and enjoyed a meteoric rise through the ranks. Before his first team debut Millán was promoted to the club's U-17 side, finding the back of the net three times in as many games. In 2008, he left the club to join Club Rivadavia de Lincoln in Argentina on loan, before moving on to Tigre in 2009, also on loan. He has since returned to Colo Colo.

Naval (Loan)

In December 2011, Millán joined Naval on a loan deal.
He made his debut in the league on 14 August 2011, coming on as a 61st-minute substitute against Deportes Puerto Montt. Millán then got his first goal for Naval in the 3-1 win over San Marcos de Arica on 13 November 2011.

Unión Temuco
In November 2012, it was announced that Millán was joining Unión Temuco for the 2013 season on a free transfer following the expiration of his contract with Colo Colo after the conclusion of the 2012 season. He made his debut on 16 February, losing the game 1-0 to his former club Naval. He scored his first goal for the club on 9 March 2013, scoring an 81st minute consolation goal in his side's 4-1 loss against Barnechea. He then scored again in the next game in Unión Temuco's 4-3 win over Lota Schwager.

Curicó Unido
On 12 June 2013, it was announced that Millán has signed for fellow Chilean Primera División B side Curicó Unido. On 7 July 2013, he made his debut in the Copa Chile against O'Higgins, scoring in a 3-2 loss.
On 28 July 2013, he made his league debut against CD Concepción in a match which ended 0-0.

Puerto Montt
After two seasons with Curicó Unido, Millán left the club to join newly promoted Primera B de Chile side Puerto Montt on 15 July 2015. He made his league debut on 9 August, coming on as a substitute in the 80th minute against Rangers de Talca. The match ended in a 1-0 defeat for Puerto Montt.

Iberia
In 2023, he returned to his homeland from Argentina and joined Deportes Iberia.

Playing style
At age 14 Millán was dubbed the "Chilean Cristiano Ronaldo". When asked of comparing his ability to that of the Portuguese winger Millán replied: "I think my playing style is similar to his. I enjoy using the flanks and going past defenders, and I'm particularly good at stepovers.".

Career statistics

References

External links

1991 births
Living people
Footballers from Santiago
Chilean footballers
Chilean expatriate footballers
Chile youth international footballers
Colo-Colo footballers
Rivadavia de Lincoln footballers
Club Atlético Tigre footballers
Naval de Talcahuano footballers
Unión Temuco footballers
Curicó Unido footballers
Puerto Montt footballers
Municipal La Pintana footballers
Deportes Copiapó footballers
San Marcos de Arica footballers
Independiente de Cauquenes footballers
Deportes Iberia footballers
Chilean Primera División players
Torneo Argentino A players
Argentine Primera División players
Primera B de Chile players
Segunda División Profesional de Chile players
Torneo Federal A players
Chilean expatriate sportspeople in Argentina
Expatriate footballers in Argentina
Association football forwards